The 2004 NCAA Women's Division I Swimming and Diving Championships were contested at the 23rd annual NCAA-sanctioned swim meet to determine the team and individual national champions of Division I women's collegiate swimming and diving in the United States. 

This year's events were hosted by Texas A&M University at the Student Recreation Center Natatorium in College Station, Texas.

Two-time defending champions Auburn again topped the team standings, finishing 138 points ahead of Georgia. This was the Tigers' third women's team title.

Team standings
Note: Top 10 only
(H) = Hosts
(DC) = Defending champions
Full results

See also
List of college swimming and diving teams

References

NCAA Division I Swimming And Diving Championships
NCAA Division I Swimming And Diving Championships
NCAA Division I Women's Swimming and Diving Championships